Plum pine may refer to:
Podocarpus coriaceus, the yucca plum pine
Podocarpus elatus, the Illawarra plum, or the plum pine
Podocarpus lawrencei, the mountain plum-pine
Podocarpus macrophyllus, the yew plum pine
Podocarpus spinulosus, the dwarf plum pine